The 1976 World Rally Championship was the fourth season of the Fédération Internationale de l'Automobile (FIA) World Rally Championship (WRC). 10 events were included on the schedule, as the series revisited the same locations as the previous season. The only change in the schedule was a slight shuffle in order, with Portugal being moved up to March from July.

Lancia again repeated its title, with the Stratos HF accumulating another four rally wins, and scoring more than twice as many points as its nearest competitor, Opel. The Ascona's consistency was enough for second place overall, despite no wins. Lancia's dynasty, however, would not continue, as this was to be the last WRC title for the Stratos.

From 1973 to 1978, the WRC only awarded a championship for manufacturers. Scoring was given for the highest placing entry for each manufacturer. Thus if a particular manufacturer was to place 2nd, 4th, and 10th, they would receive points for 2nd place only. However, the manufacturer would still gain an advantage in scoring from its other entries, as the points for the 4th and 10th place entries would be denied to other manufacturers.

Calendar

Manufacturers' championship 
Schedule of points by place:

Events

See also 
 1976 in sports

External links

 FIA World Rally Championship 1976 at ewrc-results.com

World Rally Championship
World Rally Championship seasons
1976 World Rally Championship season